Edwin M. Truell (August 19, 1841 – October 12, 1907) was a Union Army soldier during the American Civil War who received the Medal of Honor.

Truell was born on August 19, 1841, in Lowell, Massachusetts. He joined the 12th Wisconsin Volunteer Infantry Regiment from Mauston, Wisconsin in August 1862, and mustered out with the regiment in May 1865.  He died on October 12, 1907, and was buried in Arlington National Cemetery, Arlington County, Virginia.

Medal of Honor citation
His award citation reads:
For extraordinary heroism on 21 July 1864, while serving with Company E, 12th Wisconsin Infantry, in action at Atlanta, Georgia. Although severely wounded in a charge, Private Truell remained with the regiment until again severely wounded, losing his leg.

See also

List of Medal of Honor recipients
List of American Civil War Medal of Honor recipients: T–Z

References

Military personnel from Wisconsin
1841 births
1907 deaths
People from Lowell, Massachusetts
People from Mauston, Wisconsin
Union Army soldiers
United States Army Medal of Honor recipients
Burials at Arlington National Cemetery
American Civil War recipients of the Medal of Honor